Sir John Haslam (27 February 1878 – 21 May 1940) was a Conservative Party politician in England.  He was the Member of Parliament (MP) for Bolton from the 1931 general election until his death in 1940, aged 62.

References

External links 
 

1878 births
1940 deaths
Conservative Party (UK) MPs for English constituencies
UK MPs 1931–1935
UK MPs 1935–1945
Politics of the Metropolitan Borough of Bolton